This is a list of cricket grounds in Scotland. Cricket reached Scotland in the 18th century, with the first recorded cricket match in Scotland taking place in Alloa in 1785. But it was another 80 years before Scotland played their first full match, against Surrey in 1865, which they won by 172 runs. Cricket continued to grow in Scotland, but never reached the participation and popularity levels that the game had in England. first-class matches and List A matches were played in Scotland during the 20th century; Scotland was a host venue for the 1999 Cricket World Cup, and One Day Internationals were played. Today Scotland still has One Day International status.

List of grounds
The grounds included in this list have held at least one first-class or List A matches.  Additionally, some of the List A matches have come in the form of One Day Internationals.  A single ground has hosted a Women's One Day International.

† = Defunct venue

References

External links
Cricket grounds in Scotland at CricketArchive.

cricket
Scotland